The Canadian territory of the Northwest Territories is subdivided into administrative regions in different ways for various purposes.

Administrative regions
The Government of the Northwest Territory's Department of Municipal and Community Affairs divides the territory into five regions. Other services have adopted similar divisions for administrative purposes, making these the de facto regions of the territory. These divisions have no government of their own, but the Northwest Territories' government services are decentralized on a regional basis.

Some government departments make slight changes to this arrangement. For example, the Health and Social Services Authority groups Fort Resolution with the North Slave Region, and divides South Slave Region into two regions: Hay River and Fort Smith. The Department of Natural Resources uses the same borders, but calls the Inuvik Region "Beaufort Delta".

Land rights
Land and self-government treaties with First Nations, Inuvialuit (Inuit), and Métis groups give their governments a significant amount of authority to manage land use within agreed-upon areas. These areas are each much larger than the area fully owned by the indigenous government. Within each of these areas, the indigenous nation has jurisdiction over several areas of law, and land use is effectively co-governed by the territorial government and indigenous government.

A treaty also exists with the Salt River First Nation, but it establishes reserves rather than a joint land use area.

Census divisions

Statistics Canada divides the territory into six census divisions. These areas exist solely for the purposes of statistical analysis and presentation; they have no government of their own. They are listed below with their most populous municipality on the right:

Region 1 – Inuvik
Region 2 – Norman Wells
Region 3 – Behchokǫ̀
Region 4 – Fort Simpson
Region 5 – Fort Smith
Region 6 – Yellowknife

Former census divisions

1999-2011
Prior to the 2011 census, there were two census divisions. The former census division of Inuvik was considerably larger than the administrative region of the same name.
Fort Smith Region – Fort Smith
Inuvik Region – Inuvik

Before 1999

Prior to the division of the NWT and the creation of Nunavut in 1999, there were five census divisions.  Their boundaries were altered somewhat as part of the adjustment.
Baffin Region
Fort Smith Region
Inuvik Region
Keewatin Region
Kitikmeot Region

See also
 List of regions of Nunavut

References

Regions of the Northwest Territories
Census divisions of the Canadian territories